Élisabeth Cibot (born 1960 in Nantes, Pays de la Loire) is a French sculptor and art historian.

Biography

Born into an artistic family, collectors of Italian Renaissance bronzes, Élisabeth Cibot has been surrounded by sculpture ever since her birth.  
She studied art form at France's major art school, the École nationale supérieure des Beaux-Arts (ENSBA) under the direction of great sculptors such as Etienne Martin, Léopold Kretz and CESAR. From 1981 to 1983, she worked with painter Riccardo Licata at Centro Internazionale di Grafica in Venice. She was also guest artist at the Harvey Littleton Glass School at Spruce Pine, USA in 1983. Since then she has developed a strong interest in glass and mixed media furniture design.
In parallel to her artistic creation, she studied art history, presenting her first thesis, on Roman Archeology, in 1984 which was followed by a DEA (Diploma in Specialist Studies) in the History of Techniques in 1990. In 1993, she returned to bronze statuary and monumental work. Since 1997 she lives and works near Paris. She claims "Art is a support for our questioning about the world and the meaning of life, a path of self-knowledge that makes us capable of opening up to others. On this road, I seek while building."

Awards and distinctions
2017 :  Conti Sculpture Award (presented by Mr Michel Poniatowsky) 
2015 :  Gold medal of sculpture (Société Nationale des Beaux-Arts)
2013 :  Camille Claudel Sculpture Award, Société Nationale des Beaux-Arts
2009 :  Grant from the Fondation Taylor
2006 :  Gabriel Diana Award, Société Nationale des Beaux-Arts
2005 :  Award, Fondation Taylor
2004 :  Paul Belmondo Award, Salon d’Automne
2003 :  Sculpture Award, Amis du Salon d’Automne
2000 :  Michel Dumont Award, Salon des Artistes Français
1997 :  Bronze medal, Salon des Artistes Français

Recognition
 Permanent Member of the Salon d'Automne
 Permanent Member of the Société Nationale des Beaux-Arts

List of permanent public installations

Lalbenque, "Lo Trufair" (bronze 1,20 m), City Hall
Sarrebourg : "Tellina" (bronze 1.50 M H)
Calais : "Homage to Charles de Gaulle et Yvonne Vendroux"(bronze 3 M H)
Nogent-sur-Marne: « Lady of Val Nure » (bronze 2.50 m H)
Lyon : "Homage to Pope Jean-Paul II" (bronze 3 m H)
Drancy : "Homage to Charles de Gaulle"
Nantes, Monument « Captain Nemo and Jules Verne »
Pontault-Combault : Monumental bust of François Mitterrand
Béthune : Monumental bust of François Mitterrand
Vouziers : "François Mitterrand and his dog"
Béthune : Monumental bust of Willy Brandt

Bibliography

 Création et innovation chez Baccarat et Daum entre 1890 et 1990, Élisabeth Cibot-Genin - 1992
 Création artistique et innovation dans l'industrie verrière en France 1880-1989, Élisabeth Cibot-Genin - 2004
Dialogues d'atelier, Élisabeth Cibot, Foreword : Julien Denoun and Jean-Philippe Ricard, Photographer : Alan Tournaille - Centro Internazionale della Grafica di Venezia - 2008

References
Sources
Arts of the representation, Revue Jules Verne n°33-34, p. 209-212. 
LA PERRIERE Patrice (de), «Jules Verne, le Capitaine Nemo et Élisabeth Cibot», in Univers des Arts, n°108, p. 24-25, février 2006.
LA PERRIERE Patrice (de), «Élisabeth Cibot, hommage au Général de Gaulle», in Univers des Arts, n°122, p. 43, juin 2007.
«Guide Emer de l’Art Contemporain», Aline Jaulin and Didier Bernheim, Ed. Froville,1995.
BLOCH-DERMANT J., «Élisabeth Cibot», in Le verre en France, les années 80, Ed. de l’Amateur, Paris, 1988, p. 25-27.
DOLEZ A., «Paravent, l’aigle Élisabeth Cibot», in Glass animals,  Ed. Abram’s, New York, 1988, p. 184-185.
BERNSTEIN A., «Paravent Elisabeth Cibot», in Neues Glass ( Allemagne), janvier 1988, p. 33.

Notes

External links
Société Nationale des Beaux-Arts website
 Elisabeth Cibot official website
Art "Salons" in France

Artists from Paris
20th-century French sculptors
21st-century French sculptors
1960 births
Living people
Artists from Nantes